Ann Street may refer to:

 Ann Street, Belfast, Northern Ireland
 Ann Street, Boston, Massachusetts, US
 Ann Street, Brisbane, Australia
 Ann Street (now Ann Uccello Street), Hartford, Connecticut, United States; namesake of the Ann Street Historic District
 Ann Street (Manhattan), New York, US

See also
 Ann Street Barry, actress, maiden name Ann Street